These are the results of 2019 BWF World Senior Championships' 55+ events.

Men's singles

Seeds 
  Pornroj Banditpisut (quarterfinals)
  Chang Wen-sung (second round)
  Geir Olve Storvik (gold medalist)
  Magnus Nytell (quarterfinals)
  Martin Qvist Olesen (bronze medalist)
  Chang Ta-ming (quarterfinals)
  Harjit Singh (withdrew)
  Henrik Madsen (third round)
  Nils Carlson (fourth round)
  Michael Huber (fourth round)
  Jack Keith Priestman (bronze medalist)
  Ram Lakhan (fourth round)
  Martin Staden (second round)
  Jean-Jacques Bontemps (third round)
  Bengt Mellquist (second round)
  Klaus Buschbeck (third round)

Finals

Top half

Section 1

Section 2

Section 3

Section 4

Bottom half

Section 5

Section 6

Section 7

Section 8

Women's singles

Seeds 
  Zhou Xin (gold medalist)
  Ye Wang (third round)
  Sian Williams (third round)
  Manjusha Sudhir Sahasrabudhe (silver medalist)
  Jeannette van der Werff (bronze medalist)
  Lone Hagelskjær Knudsen (quarterfinals)
  Cathy Jane Bargh (bronze medalist)
  Irina Shalmanova (third round)

Finals

Top half

Section 1

Section 2

Bottom half

Section 3

Section 4

Men's doubles

Seeds 
  Surachai Makkasasithorn / Nattapol Sanlekanun (bronze medalists)
  Pornroj Banditpisut / Bovornovadep Devakula (bronze medalists)
  Chang Ta-ming / Chang Wen-sung (withdrew)
  Morten Christensen / Martin Qvist Olesen (quarterfinals)
  Toru Koizumi / Noriaki Matsunari (third round)
  Nils Carlson / Bengt Mellquist (third round)
  Arnold Dendeng /  Rohan Feranando (second round)
  Jan Bertram Petersen / Jesper Kritter Tolman (quarterfinals)

Finals

Top half

Section 1

Section 2

Bottom half

Section 3

Section 4

Women's doubles

Seeds 
  Ye Wang /  Zhou Xin (quarterfinals)
  Pamela Peard / Sian Williems (bronze medalists)
  Christine Summers / Tracy Walker (quarterfinals)
  Sandra Kroon / Jeannette van der Werff (silver medalists)

Finals

Top half

Section 1

Section 2

Bottom half

Section 3

Section 4

Mixed doubles

Seeds 
  Bobby Ertanto /  Heidi Bender (bronze medalists)
  Chang Wen-sung / Tu Hsiu-hsia (withdrew)
  Jan Bertram Petersen /  Jeannette van der Werff (bronze medalists)
  Magnus Nytell /  Helle Sjørring (gold medalists)
  Graham Henderson / Pamela Peard (quarterfinals)
  Gene Austin Joyner / Launa Eyles (second round)
  Steven Thomson / Jill Smith (quarterfinals)
  Ram Lakhan / Manjusha Sudhir Sahasrabudhe (quarterfinals)

Finals

Top half

Section 1

Section 2

Bottom half

Section 3

Section 4

References 
Men's singles
Women's singles
Men's doubles
Women's doubles
Mixed doubles

2019 BWF World Senior Championships